Sa Pa may refer to:

 Sa Pa , a district-level town (formerly a rural district) of Lào Cai Province, Vietnam
 Sa Pa ward, a ward of Sa Pa town
 Former Sa Pa township, dissolved in 2019 to form the six new wards of Sa Pa town